Lists of automobile-related articles cover a wide range of topics related to cars. The lists are organized by manufacturer, region, sport, technology and so on.

General
List of current automobile manufacturers by country
List of current automobile marques
List of automobile manufacturers
List of automobile marques
List of automobile museums
List of fictional automobiles
Portal:Cars
Orphan (car)
Timeline of motor vehicle brands
List of automobiles considered the worst

Geographic
List of automobiles manufactured in Argentina
Automotive industry in Australia 
Automotive industry in Bangladesh
Automotive industry in Brazil
List of automobiles manufactured in Brazil
Automotive industry in Canada
List of automobiles manufactured in Ontario
Automotive industry in China
List of automobile manufacturers of China
List of Czech automobiles
Automotive industry in France
List of automobile manufacturers of France
Automotive industry in Germany
List of automobile manufacturers of Germany
Automotive industry in India
Automotive industry in Chennai 
Automotive industry in Iran
Automotive industry in Ireland 
Automotive industry in Italy
List of automobile manufacturers of Italy
Automotive industry in Japan
List of automobile manufacturers of Japan
Timeline of Japanese automobiles
Automotive industry in Mexico
Automotive industry in New Zealand
Automotive industry in North Korea
Automotive industry in Pakistan
Automotive industry in Romania
Automotive industry in Russia
Automotive industry in South Korea
Automotive industry in the Soviet Union
Automotive industry in Spain
List of Spanish automobiles
Automotive industry in Portugal
List of Portugueses automobiles
Automotive industry in Sweden
List of automobile manufacturers of Sweden
Automotive industry in Turkey
Automotive industry in the United Kingdom
List of car manufacturers of the United Kingdom
Automotive industry in the United States
List of automobiles manufactured in the United States
List of automobile manufacturers of the United States
List of defunct automobile manufacturers of the United States
List of Asian automobile manufacturers
List of Eastern European automobiles
List of Western European automobile manufacturers
List of microcars by country of origin
 Timeline of European automobiles

Motorsport
List of international auto racing colors
List of exclusively sports car manufacturers

Organisations
Association for Standardisation of Automation and Measuring Systems
European Automobile Manufacturers Association
Organisation Internationale des Constructeurs d'Automobiles
SAE International
Automotive Research Association of India

Sales and service
List of automobile sales by model
List of bestselling automobiles
List of automobile dealerships and repair shops
Filling station
List of historic filling stations

Superlatives
List of automotive superlatives
List of fastest cars by acceleration
Production car speed record
List of production cars by power output
List of longest consumer road vehicles
Most expensive cars sold in auction

Technology
List of automobiles with continuously variable transmissions
List of diesel automobiles
List of production battery electric vehicles

Types
Car body style
List of buses
List of Mini-based cars
List of minivans
List of sport utility vehicles
List of badge engineered vehicles
List of "M" series military vehicles
List of sports cars

Vehicles by manufacturer and marque
List of AMC legacy midsize and large cars
List of Audi vehicles
List of Aston Martin vehicles
List of Bentley vehicles
List of BMW vehicles
List of Bugatti vehicles
List of Buick vehicles
List of Cadillac vehicles
List of Chalmers vehicles
List of Chevrolet vehicles
List of Chrysler vehicles
List of Citroen vehicles
List of DeSoto vehicles
List of Dodge vehicles
List of Eagle vehicles
List of Ferrari road cars
List of Fiat passenger cars
List of Ford vehicles
List of GAC vehicles
List of Geo vehicles
List of Hyundai vehicles
List of Holden vehicles
List of Honda vehicles
List of Imperial vehicles
List of Iran Khodro vehicles
List of Jeep vehicles
List of Kia vehicles
List of Lamborghini automobiles
List of LaSalle vehicles
List of Lexus vehicles
List of Lincoln vehicles
List of Maserati vehicles
List of Maxwell vehicles
List of Mazda vehicles
List of Mercedes-Benz vehicles
List of Mercury vehicles
List of Mitsubishi vehicles
List of NSU vehicles
List of Nissan vehicles
List of Opel vehicles
List of Peugeot vehicles
List of Proton vehicles
List of Plymouth vehicles
List of Pontiac vehicles
List of Ram vehicles
List of Renault vehicles
List of Saab vehicles
List of SEAT vehicles
List of Škoda vehicles
List of Subaru vehicles
List of Suzuki vehicles
List of Tesla vehicles
List of Toyota vehicles
List of Vauxhall vehicles
List of Venturi vehicles
List of Volkswagen vehicles
List of Volvo vehicles

List of manufacturers by motor vehicle production
AvtoVAZ
BAIC Group
BMW
Changan Automobile
Chrysler
Daihatsu
Daimler AG
Dongfeng Motor Corporation
Dongfeng Motor Group
FAW Group
Ferrari
Fiat Automobiles
Fiat Chrysler Automobiles
Ford Motor Company
Geely
General Motors
GM Korea
Great Wall Motors
Groupe PSA
Honda
Hyundai Motor Group
Mazda
Mitsubishi
Mitsubishi Motors
Nissan
Renault
SAIC Motor
Subaru
Suzuki
Tata Motors
Toyota
Volkswagen Group

Awards

General
Automotive Hall of Fame
Car of the Year
International Car of the Year
Sports Car International Top Sports Cars
World Car of the Year

Geographic
Canadian Car of the Year
Car of the Year Japan
European Car of the Year
North American Car of the Year
Semperit Irish Car of the Year

Technology
International Engine of the Year
Louis Schwitzer Award
PACE Award
Ward's 10 Best Engines

Magazine
Automobile Magazine All-Stars
Motor Trend Car of the Year
RJC Car of the Year
Wheels Car of the Year

List of engines Automotives
List of BMW engines
List of Ferrari engines
List of Ford engines
List of Isuzu engines
List of Mercedes-Benz engines
List of Nissan engines
List of Porsche engines
List of PSA engines
List of Renault engines
List of Subaru engines
List of Suzuki engines
List of Toyota engines
List of Volkswagen Group engines
List of Volvo engines
Mitsubishi Motors engines

Steam Vehicles
List of steam car makers
List of traction engine manufacturers